Poecilocharax is a genus of South American darters in the family Crenuchidae from the Amazon, Orinoco and Potaro basins.  There are currently four described species in this genus.

Species
 Poecilocharax bovaliorum C. H. Eigenmann, 1909
 Poecilocharax callipterus Ohara, Pastana & Camelier, 2022
 Poecilocharax rhizophilus Ohara, Pastana & Camelier, 2022
 Poecilocharax weitzmani Géry, 1965

References
 

Characiformes genera
Taxa named by Carl H. Eigenmann
Fish of South America
Crenuchidae